Manfred Geisler (born 31 July 1949) is a German former sports shooter. He competed in the trap event at the 1972 Summer Olympics for East Germany.

References

External links
 

1949 births
Living people
German male sport shooters
Olympic shooters of East Germany
Shooters at the 1972 Summer Olympics
Sportspeople from Mecklenburg-Western Pomerania